TO-252, also known as DPAK or Decawatt Package, is a semiconductor package developed by Motorola for surface mounting on circuit boards. It represents a surface-mount variant of TO-251 package, and smaller variant of the D2PAK package. It is often used for high-power MOSFETs and voltage regulators.

Variants 

Package can have 3 pins with  pitch or 5 pins with  pitch. The middle pin is usually connected to the tab. The middle pin is sometimes omitted.

See also 
 TO-263

References

External links 
 TO-252 standard from JEDEC
 TO-252 drawings from ON Semiconductor
 TO-252 package details from Central Semiconductor Corp.
 TO-252 (DPAK) package information from Amkor Technology

Semiconductor packages